The Constitutional Court of Republika Srpska (Bosnian and Serbian: Ustavni sud Republike Srpske/Уставни суд Републике Српске) plays a central role within Bosnia and Herzegovina entity of Republika Srpska. This is a judicial court founded on February 28, 1992.

See also
Politics of Bosnia and Herzegovina
Constitution of Republika Srpska
Judiciary
Politics of Republika Srpska
Rule According to Higher Law
Rule of law

References

External links
 

S
Arbitration courts and tribunals
1992 establishments in Bosnia and Herzegovina
Courts and tribunals established in 1992